Al Ennis (1897 – February 8, 1958) was an American football executive and tennis player. He was the general manager of the Philadelphia Eagles in 1947. 

From 1942 to 1946 he was the publicity director of the Eagles. He stepped down after one season as the general manager. From 1950 until his death in 1958, he was on the National Football League (NFL) staff. Ennis was a professional tennis player from the 1920s to the 1930s.

References

1897 births
1958 deaths
Philadelphia Eagles executives
Professional tennis promoters
Professional tennis players before the Open Era